The 1926 VPI Gobblers football team represented Virginia Polytechnic Institute in the 1926 college football season.  The team was led by their head coach Andy Gustafson and finished with a record of five wins, three losses and one tie (5–3–1).  This was the first season played in Miles Stadium.

Schedule

Players
The following players were members of the 1926 football team according to the roster published in the 1927 edition of The Bugle, the Virginia Tech yearbook.

References

VPI
Virginia Tech Hokies football seasons
VPI Gobblers football